The Masked Singer Switzerland is a Swiss reality singing competition television series adapted from the South Korean format King of Mask Singer. The first season premiered on ProSieben Schweiz on 13 November 2020, and is hosted by Alexandra Maurer. The show features celebrities singing in head-to-toe costumes and face masks which conceal their identities from other contestants, panelists, and an audience. The second season will premiere on 10 November 2021 and will now be hosted by Anna Maier along with former guest panelist of season 1, Christa Rigozzi replacing Steffi Buchli on the judging panel. A third season is set to premiere on 12 October 2022.

Panelists and host

Guest panelists
Throughout the season, various guest judges appeared alongside Steffi Buchli and Luca Hänni as the third member of the judging panel, for one episode in the first seasons. The same applies for the second season as well except with Christa Rigozzi joining in place of Steffi Buchli.

These guest panelists have included:

Series overview

Season 1

Week 1 (13 November)

Week 2 (20 November)

Week 3 (27 November)

Week 4 (4 December)

Week 5 (11 December)

Week 6 (18 December)
Group performance: "Don't Stop Believin'" by Journey

Season 2

Week 1 (10 November)

Week 2 (17 November)

Week 3 (24 November)

Week 4 (1 December)

Week 5 (8 December)

Week 6 (15 December) - Finale
Group performance:  "TBA" by TBA

Season 3

Week 1 (12 October)

Week 2 (19 October)

Week 3 (26 October)

Week 4 (2 November)

Week 5 (9 November)

Week 6 (16 November)
 Group performance: "Heroes" by David Bowie

References

External links
 
 The Masked Singer Switzerland on Internet Movie Database

Swiss television series
2020 Swiss television series debuts
2020s Swiss television series
German-language television shows
Masked Singer
ProSieben Schweiz